The 2022 World Pool Masters was a nine-ball pool tournament which took place in Gibraltar from 5–8 May 2022. It was the 28th edition of the World Pool Masters invitational tournament organised by Matchroom Pool.

Format
The event was played as a single elimination tournament, with players competing in a preliminary round based on rankings. The tournament prize fund was the same as of the last edition, with a total prize fund of $100,000.
The total prize money awarded is listed below:

Main draw

The following table denotes the event's draw and results. Numbers to the left of a player's names indicates their seeding, whilst bolding indicates the winner of a match. Chang Yu-Lung and Omar Al-Shaheen withdrew on May 2 due to travel issues and were replaced by Mario He and Mika Immonen.

References

World Pool Masters
World Pool Masters
World Pool Masters
International sports competitions hosted by Gibraltar
World Pool Masters